Samuel "Mingo Jack" Johnson (1820 – March 5, 1886) was an African-American man falsely accused of rape. He was brutally beaten and hanged by a mob of white men in Eatontown, New Jersey.

Biography
Johnson was born in Colts Neck in 1820 and was raised as a slave by the Laird family. Because he was short, the family used him as a jockey, and he rode a colt named Chief Mingo to victory, earning him the nickname Mingo Jack. In 1840, New Jersey abolished slavery, and Johnson worked odd jobs in the Eatontown and Middletown areas, living in Eatontown near what is now Route 35 and Poplar Road.

Lynching
In March 1886, a white woman, Angelina Herbert, was raped and beaten. She could not identify her attacker, but reported that the attacker had asked her, "Do you know Mingo Jack"? Johnson was arrested. That night, a mob of up to 75 people chiseled holes in the wall of the jail in which Mingo Jack was held and fired guns, attempting to kill Johnson. When that effort failed, they stormed the jail, beat Johnson and hanged him.

A sham trial for some members of the lynch mob was held, featuring drunken witnesses and a jury that included the prominent townsman Thomas White, resulting in acquittals for all the defendants. Information from the trial, including testimony from Mrs. Herbert, revealed that Johnson couldn't have been the rapist.

No one was convicted for the murder of Mingo Jack, who left behind a wife and five children. Another black man, George Kearney, later confessed to the rape, although that confession may have been coerced.

In 2012, Mayor Gerald Tarantolo issued a public apology for the failure of security at the jail, calling the lynching "a low point in the history of Eatontown". A small memorial was placed in Wampum Park.

See also
False accusations of rape as justification for lynchings

References

1820 births
1886 deaths
1886 murders in the United States
African-American history of New Jersey
Lynching deaths in New Jersey
People from Colts Neck Township, New Jersey
People from Eatontown, New Jersey
Racially motivated violence against African Americans
19th-century American slaves
African-American jockeys